Ilsan New Town refers to a planned city occupying Ilsandong-gu and Ilsanseo-gu of Goyang.

Ilsan is located northwest of Seoul. Like other satellite cities in the Seoul National Capital Area such as Bundang, Ilsan was planned in order to alleviate housing shortages in the city of Seoul.  Ilsan has experienced phenomenal growth in the past 15 years, usually drawing in younger generations of upper middle-class and upper-class Koreans.

Attractions
Ilsan is home to Lake Park. Lake Park features a variety of wild flowers and plants, such as a cactus arboretum and botanical gardens, recreational facilities, a 4.7 km bike path, and a musical fountain. It is the venue for the annual Goyang Korea Flower Show.

The area surrounding Lake Park is a large and sprawling commercial district, which includes Lotte Department Store, Grand Department Store, Hyundai Department Store, as well as La Festa and Western Dom, which host hundreds of stores, restaurants, entertainment venues, and nightlife.

Ilsan's dynamic culture and beautiful urban landscape are featured in numerous Korean TV shows. As a result, the production centers of MBC and SBS, two of the three largest television networks in Korea, are located in Ilsan.

A large Costco store is located at Baekseok Station.

Jeongbalsan Park is located in the center of Ilsan. It is a large residential park which features a large hiking hill with trails, a large Buddhist temple, some historical thatched roof houses, and an outdoor gymnasium.

Goyang Stadium is located near Daehwa Station. It includes a main stadium and a basketball gymnasium.

Goyang Aram Nuri Arts Center is between Lake Park and Jeongbalsan mountain. The theater has 1,887 seats.  It is the only wind-pipe concert hall north of the Han River with more than 1,000 seats.

The Korean International Exhibition Center KINTEX is located in Ilsan. It hosts the annual Seoul Motor Show.

The National Cancer Center of Korea is in the Baekseok neighborhood.

Transportation
Ilsan is on Line 3 and the Gyeongui Line of the Seoul Metropolitan Subway. It has local, inter-city, and transit (to Seoul) buses.

Education

Numerous schools have been built in Ilsandong-gu and Ilsanseo-gu since the 1980s as the Ilsan New City (일산신도시) was being developed. Starting from 2002, the High School Equalization Policy (고교평준화제도) came into effect, which abolished the former high school admission policies based on the Yeonhabgosa (Unified Entrance Examination, 연합고사).

Ilsandong-gu has 33 schools including: 19 elementary schools, 6 middle schools, 7 high schools, and 1 special school.

Ilsanseo-gu has 46 schools including: 22 elementary schools, 12 middle schools, 9 high schools, and 2 special schools.

Jeongbalsan (정발산), Hugok (후곡) and Baengma (백마) are notable for their many hagwons (학원, "cram school").

Photos

References

New towns in South Korea
Goyang
New towns started in the 2000s